The Rio del Rey (also called Rio del Ray) is an estuary of a drainage basin in West Africa in Cameroon. It is located in the eastern area of the Niger River system. The Cameroon volcanic line separates Rio Del Rey from the Douala basin. Rio del Rey has been described as an estuary in which "the two rivers N'dian and Massake flow out". The mouth is close to the border with Nigeria and has connections to the Cross River estuary from which it is separated by the Bakassi peninsula. The Rio del Rey estuary has been designated as a Ramsar site since 2010.

See also
 List of rivers of Cameroon

References

Further reading
 Mangrove Ecosystems: Function and Management. p. 71.

Rivers of Cameroon
Ramsar sites in Cameroon
Southwest Region (Cameroon)